Quarry is an American neo-noir crime drama television series based on the novels of Max Allan Collins. An eight-episode first season was ordered by Cinemax in February 2015. The series was created for television by Graham Gordy and Michael D. Fuller and was directed by Greg Yaitanes. While the series' main setting is Memphis, it was filmed in both Memphis and New Orleans. The series premiered on Cinemax on September 9, 2016. In May 2017, it was announced that the series had been canceled.

Quarry is the story of Mac Conway, a Marine who returns home to Memphis from Vietnam in 1972 and finds himself shunned by those he loves and demonized by the public. As he struggles to cope with his experiences at war, Conway is drawn into a network of killing and corruption that spans the length of the Mississippi River.

Cast and characters

Main
Logan Marshall-Green as Lloyd McKinnon 'Mac' Conway, Jr. / Quarry, a Marine who returns home to Memphis from two tours in Vietnam
Jodi Balfour as Joni Conway, Mac's wife and a reporter for a Memphis newspaper.
Damon Herriman as Buddy
Edoardo Ballerini as Karl
Nikki Amuka-Bird as Ruth Solomon, a close friend of Joni and wife of Arthur Solomon
Aoibhinn McGinnity as Mary
Mustafa Shakir as Moses, a henchman of The Broker.
Peter Mullan as The Broker

Supporting
Jamie Hector as Arthur Solomon, Mac's best friend who also served in the Marines during the Vietnam War and Ruth's husband.
Skipp Sudduth as Lloyd, Mac's father.
Kurt Yaeger as Suggs
Happy Anderson as Detective Vern Ratliff
Josh Randall as Detective Tommy Olsen, a member of the Memphis Police Department.
Ólafur Darri Ólafsson as Credence Mason
Ann Dowd as Naomi, the mother of Buddy.
Tom Noonan as Oldcastle
Matt Nable as Thurston
Joshua J. Williams as Marcus
Kaley Ronayne as Sandy Williams

Production
Cinemax ordered a pilot in April 2013. Quarry received an eight-episode series order in February 2015 and filming began on March 30, 2015.

Episodes

Reception
The series received generally positive reviews from television critics. On the review aggregation website Rotten Tomatoes, it has an approval rating of 78%, based on 27 reviews, with an average rating of 7.1/10. The site's critical consensus is, "Quarry's distinctive setting and intriguing characters are just enough to offset a bleak narrative that struggles to make consistently compelling use of its assets." Metacritic, which uses a normalized rating, gave it a score of 72 out of 100, based on 15 critics, indicating "generally favorable reviews".

Home media
The first season was released on Blu-ray and DVD on February 14, 2017.

References

External links

2016 American television series debuts
2016 American television series endings
2010s American crime drama television series
Cinemax original programming
English-language television shows
Television shows based on American novels
Television series set in 1972
Television shows set in Tennessee
Television series by Anonymous Content
Neo-noir television series